Aleksander Axer (10 October 1880 – 4 October  1948) was a Polish mathematician from Przemyśl who introduced Axer's theorem.

He died suddenly of complications from pharyngitis in Zurich, shortly before his 68th birthday.

References

Polish mathematicians
1948 deaths
1880 births
People from Przemyśl